This is a list of Mexican films released in 2009.

2009

External links

List of 2009 box office number-one films in Mexico

References

2009
Films
Mexican